Jean François Porchez (born in 1964) is a French type designer. He founded the French type foundry Typofonderie in 1994. He was president of ATypI (Association Typographique Internationale), the leading organisation of type designers from 2004 to 2007. He is probably best known for releasing the new typefaces for Le Monde, the French evening newspaper in 1994. He has designed custom typefaces for customers such as Beyoncé Knowles, Costa Crocieres, France Télécom, Peugeot, RATP (Public Transport in Paris). For the Linotype Library Platinum collection, he did Sabon Next, a revival of Sabon, itself Jan Tschichold's revival of Garamond.

Porchez has been a visiting lecturer at the MA typeface design MATD program at the Reading University (United Kingdom) and regularly conducts type design workshops all over the world. He also contributes regularly to conferences and international publications. He published Lettres Françaises, a book (in French & English) that, at the time, showed a large selection of contemporary French digital typefaces. In late 2001 he was the President of a jury set up by the Ministère de l’Éducation Nationale to select the new handwriting model and system for France and was a jury member of the 3rd Linotype Type Design Contest.

He founded the community blog and website Le Typographe, dedicated to French speaking typography and typeface design.

References

External links

 Typofonderie
 ZeCraft: Bespoke fonts by Jean François Porchez
 Blog: Chez Porchez
 Typofonderie on Facebook
 Typofonderie on Twitter
 Designing typefaces: For more reference to this biography
 The Blank sheet project for Arjowiggins on YouTube
 Work Inspiration with Jean François Porchez - Interview on Workspiration.org
  Interview détaillée 
  Caractère Le Monde
  Site de son entreprise
  Entretien avec Jean-François Porchez
  Entretien vidéo de Jean-François Porchez par le Who's Who in France

French typographers and type designers
Logo designers
French graphic designers
1964 births
Living people
Chevaliers of the Ordre des Arts et des Lettres